Old U.S. Post Office may refer to:

(by state then city)
Old U.S. Post Office and Courthouse (Miami, Florida), listed on the National Register of Historic Places (NRHP)
Old U.S. Post Office and Federal Building (Macon, Georgia), NRHP-listed
Old U.S. Post Office (Niles, Michigan), NRHP-listed  
 Old U.S. Post Office, Courthouse, and Customhouse (Biloxi, Mississippi)
 Old U.S. Post Office (Ripley, Mississippi)
 Old United States Post Office (Philadelphia, Mississippi)
Old U.S. Post Office (Corinth, Mississippi), NRHP-listed, included in the Downtown Corinth Historic District
Old U.S. Post Office (Williston, North Dakota), NRHP-listed  
Old U.S. Post Office (Marion, Ohio), NRHP-listed
Old U.S. Post Office (Bend, Oregon), NRHP-listed
Old U.S. Post Office and Courts Building (Jefferson, Texas), NRHP-listed

See also
List of United States post offices